Alejandro García González (born 17 July 2003), is a Mexican racing driver who is currently competing in the 2023 FIA Formula 3 Championship with Jenzer Motorsport. He previously competed in the Euroformula Open Championship.

Career

Karting
García competed in karting over 2018 and 2019, and finished 2nd in the FIA Mexico National Karting Championship in 2018.

Formula 4
García made his racing debut in the 2018-19 NACAM Formula 4 Championship, where he finished 5th in the overall standings. 

In 2020, he competed in the F4 Spanish Championship with Global Racing Service, where he came 22nd in the standings. He switched to Campos Racing for the 2021 season, where he finished 24th.

Euroformula Open
The following year, García competed in the Euroformula Open Championship with Team Motopark. He scored a podium at Monza and ended up seventh in the standings, behind his teammates Ollie Goethe and Frederick Lubin.

FIA Formula 3
García drove for Jenzer Motorsport in the 3-day post-season test of the 2022 FIA Formula 3 Championship, teaming up with fellow rookies Nikita Bedrin and Taylor Barnard. On 27 January 2023, he was signed by the Swiss team for the 2023 season.

Karting record

Karting career summary

Racing record

Racing career summary

* Season still in progress.

Complete NACAM Formula 4 Championship results
(key) (Races in bold indicate pole position) (Races in italics indicate fastest lap)

Complete F4 Spanish Championship results 
(key) (Races in bold indicate pole position) (Races in italics indicate fastest lap)

Complete Euroformula Open Championship results 
(key) (Races in bold indicate pole position) (Races in italics indicate fastest lap)

Complete European Le Mans Series results
(key) (Races in bold indicate pole position; results in italics indicate fastest lap)

Complete FIA Formula 3 Championship results 
(key) (Races in bold indicate pole position) (Races in italics indicate fastest lap)

* Season still in progress.

References

External links

2003 births
Living people
Mexican racing drivers
FIA Formula 3 Championship drivers
Spanish F4 Championship drivers
Euroformula Open Championship drivers
Motopark Academy drivers
Campos Racing drivers
Jenzer Motorsport drivers
Racing drivers from Mexico City
NACAM F4 Championship drivers
European Le Mans Series drivers